Brian Philip Kerry (born 18 December 1948) was an English professional footballer who played as a forward.

References

1948 births
Footballers from Rotherham
English footballers
Association football forwards
Grimsby Town F.C. players
Huddersfield Town A.F.C. players
Boston United F.C. players
English Football League players
Living people
People from Maltby, South Yorkshire